Charter Alley is a village in north east Hampshire, England. According to the Post Office the majority of the population at the 2011 Census was included in the civil parish of Wootton St Lawrence.  The village was originally known as West Sherbourne and then Charter Ley before becoming Charter Alley.

References

External links

Villages in Hampshire